Bode Rhodes-Vivour  CFR (born 22 March 1951) is a Nigerian jurist and former Justice of the Supreme Court of Nigeria.

Early life
Bode Rhodes-vivour was born on March 22, 1951 in Lagos Island, a city of Lagos State western Nigeria.
to the family of Mr and Mrs Akinwunmi Rhodes-Vivour. He obtained a bachelor's degree in Law from the University of Lagos in 1974 and was Called to the Bar in 1975 after graduating from the Nigerian Law School.
In 1983, he received a certificate in Legislative Drafting from the University of Nairobi under the Commonwealth Programme.

Law career
In 1975, he joined the Lagos State Judiciary as State Counsel and became Director of Public Prosecutions in 1989. He was appointed a High Court Judge in 1994 and in 2005 appointed to the Nigerian courts of appeal as Justice.

In August 2010, he was appointed a Justice of the Supreme Court of Nigeria along with Justice Suleiman Galadima.

Personal life
He is married to Adedoyin Rhodes-Vivour.

See also
List of Justice of the Nigerian courts of appeals

References

1951 births
Nigerian jurists
People from Lagos
University of Lagos alumni
Nigerian Law School alumni
Living people
Supreme Court of Nigeria justices
Residents of Lagos